Shujauddin Butt (10 April 1930 – 7 February 2006) was a Pakistani army officer and cricketer who played in 19 Tests from 1954 to 1962.

He served in the Pakistan Army for 26 years, retiring as a lieutenant colonel in 1978. In 1955 he toured India with the Pakistan national team.
He was educated at Islamia College, Lahore.
In 1971 he was captured during the Bangladesh war and held as a prisoner-of-war in India for 18 months.

He managed Pakistan's tours to Australia and the West Indies in 1976–77. He wrote two books of Pakistan cricket history, From Babes of Cricket to World Champions (1996) and The Chequered History of Pakistan Cricket (2003), with Mohammed Salim Parvez.

Butt died in London on 7 February 2006.

References

External links
 Shujauddin Butt at CricketArchive
 Shujauddin at Cricinfo

1930 births
2006 deaths
Bahawalpur cricketers
Combined Services (Pakistan) cricketers
Northern India cricketers
Pakistani cricketers
Pakistani cricket administrators
Pakistan Test cricketers
Punjab (Pakistan) cricketers
Punjab University cricketers
Rawalpindi cricketers
Central Zone (Pakistan) cricketers
North Zone (Pakistan) cricketers
Pakistan Eaglets cricketers
Pakistan Army officers
Pakistani prisoners of war
Cricket historians and writers